Bicknoller is a village and civil parish on the western slopes of the Quantock Hills in the English county of Somerset.

Administratively, the civil parish falls within the Somerset West and Taunton local government district within the Somerset shire county, with administrative tasks shared between county, district and parish councils. In 2011, the parish had a population of 371.

The village is on the routes of the Coleridge Way and the Macmillan Way West.

History

Above the village lies Trendle Ring, an Iron Age settlement.

The parish of Bicknoller was part of the Williton and Freemanners Hundred.

The village was known in 1291 as Bykenalre which means Bica's alder tree.

From 1430 to 1857 the manor was held by Wells Cathedral.

Governance

The parish council has responsibility for local issues, including setting an annual precept (local rate) to cover the council's operating costs and producing annual accounts for public scrutiny. The parish council evaluates local planning applications and works with the local police, district council officers, and neighbourhood watch groups on matters of crime, security, and traffic. The parish council's role also includes initiating projects for the maintenance and repair of parish facilities, as well as consulting with the district council on the maintenance, repair, and improvement of highways, drainage, footpaths, public transport, and street cleaning. Conservation matters (including trees and listed buildings) and environmental issues are also the responsibility of the council.

The village falls within the non-metropolitan district of Somerset West and Taunton, which was established on 1 April 2019. It was previously in the district of West Somerset, which was formed on 1 April 1974 under the Local Government Act 1972, and part of Williton Rural District before that. The district council is responsible for local planning and building control, local roads, council housing, environmental health, markets and fairs, refuse collection and recycling, cemeteries and crematoria, leisure services, parks, and tourism.

Somerset County Council is responsible for running the largest and most expensive local services such as education, social services, libraries, main roads, public transport, policing and fire services, trading standards, waste disposal and strategic planning.

It is also part of the Bridgwater and West Somerset county constituency represented in the House of Commons of the Parliament of the United Kingdom. It elects one Member of Parliament (MP) by the first past the post system of election, and was part of the South West England constituency of the European Parliament prior to Britain leaving the European Union in January 2020, which elected seven MEPs using the d'Hondt method of party-list proportional representation.

Religious sites

Part of the Church of St George, a Grade I listed building, dates from the 12th century and is dominated by a huge elm tree in its grounds. The church is decorated with a collection of carved angels and nightmarish animal heads. There is a memorial to William Temple, Archbishop of Canterbury, who spent his holidays in the village from 1933 to 1944.

Landmarks

Although it is closer to the neighbouring village of Halsway, Halsway Manor falls within the parish of Bicknoller. It is a manor house, now used as England's National Centre for Traditional Music, Dance and Song. The eastern end of the building dates from the fifteenth century; the western end is a nineteenth-century addition. The manor, which is mentioned in the Domesday Book, was built by Cardinal Beaufort as a hunting lodge. At one point it was occupied by insurrectionist Jack Cade. Thereafter it was a family home until the mid-1960s, when it became the folk music centre. It has been designated by English Heritage as a Grade II* listed building.

Thorncombe House was built in 1744 by the Sweeting family, but has since had a 19th-century facade added. It is Grade II listed.

Notable people

Bicknoller was the birthplace of the Somerset and England cricketer Harold Gimblett.

References

External links
Bicknoller Community website

Villages in West Somerset
Civil parishes in Somerset